Burns & Oates was a British Roman Catholic publishing house which most recently existed as an imprint of Continuum.

Company history
It was founded by James Burns in 1835, originally as a bookseller. Burns was of Presbyterian background and he gained a reputation as a High Church publisher, producing works by the Tractarians.

In 1847 his business was put in jeopardy when he converted to Catholicism, but the firm was fortunate to receive the support of John Henry Newman, who chose the firm to publish many of his works. The clerics Thomas Edward Bridgett and Ambrose St. John claimed that Newman wrote his novel Loss and Gain specifically to assist Burns.

After a while trading as Burns, James Burns took a partner, renaming the company Burns & Lambert. In 1866 they were joined by a younger man, William Wilfred Oates, making the company Burns, Lambert & Oates and later Burns & Oates. Oates was another Catholic convert, and had previously co-founded the publishing house of Austin & Oates based in Bristol. Burns & Oates passed to his son Wilfred Oates, whose sister Mother Mary Salome became one of the firm’s most successful authors. The company was designated "Publishers to the Holy See" by Pope Leo XIII.

In the United States the company's agent was The Catholic Publications Society of New York.

Book series
 The Bellarmine Series
 The Bible for Children
 Cardinal Books
 Catholic Bibliographical Series
 Clarion Books
 The Clifton Tracts
 Early Christian Series
 Faith and Fact Books: Catholic Truth in the Scientific Age Series
 Golden Library
 Herder History of Dogma Series
 A History of Philosophy
 The History of the Primitive Church
 Leisure Crafts Series
 Nature & Science Series for Children
 The New Library of Catholic Knowledge
 The Orchard Books
 Paternoster Series
 Present Problems Series
 Quaestiones Disputatae
 Scripture Textbooks for Catholic Schools
 Vision Book Series

References

Further reading
Wilfrid Wilberforce, The House of Burns and Oates. London: Burns and Oates, 1908.
(Michael Trappes-Lomax), Early Chapters in the History of Burns and Oates. London: privately printed, 1949.

External links
 
 Burns and Lambert at LC Authorities (no records, March 2020)
 Burns & Oates at LC Authorities (no records)
 

Book publishing companies of the United Kingdom
Christian publishing companies
British companies established in 1835